Justice Latimer may refer to:

Albert H. Latimer (c. 1800–1877), associate justice of the Texas Supreme Court
George W. Latimer (1900–1990), associate justice of the Utah Supreme Court and an original member of the U.S. Court of Military Appeals